Nickels may refer to:

People
 Anna B. Nickels (1832-1917), American cactus collector
 Christa Nickels (born 1952), German politician
 Greg Nickels (born 1955), two-term mayor of Seattle, Washington, United States
 Jean Nickels (1917–1985), Luxembourgian sprint canoer
 Jim Nickels (born 1947), American politician
 John L. Nickels (1931–2013), American judge
 Kelly Nickels, stage name of Henri Perret (born 1962), bass guitarist of the hard rock band L.A. Guns

Other uses
 Nickels Grill & Bar, a Canadian restaurant chain
 Nickels Arcade, a commercial building in Ann Arbor, Michigan, United States

See also
 Nichols (surname)
 Nichol, another surname
 Nickel (disambiguation)